Commerson's anchovy (Stolephorus commersonnii), also known as Devis's anchovy, long-jawed anchovy, Teri anchovy, is a species of anadromous ray-finned fish in the family Engraulidae. It is known as haalmassa in Sri Lanka, where it is widely used as a nutrient-rich fish meat. It is widely used as a live or dead bait in tuna fishery.

Description
It is a small schooling fish found in depth of 0–50m in most of the tropical areas of the Indo-Pacific oceans, including Madagascar and Mauritius eastward and towards Hong Kong and further east to Papua New Guinea in westwards. Maximum standard length is 11.2 cm. It has 21–22 anal soft rays. There are 0–5 small needle-like scutes on the belly region. Belly is slightly rounded. Body color is same as other engraulids, where body is light transparent fleshy brown with a pair of dark patches behind occiput, followed by a pair of lines to dorsal fin origin. The silver stripe is present on flanks.

Ecology
Indian anchovy usually feeds on surface plankton. Female lay oval eggs in grassy sea beds.

Human use
This fish, with the much larger Indian anchovy, is part of the cuisine of the South- and Southeast Asian marine regions. It can be crisp-fried, used to make fish-based culinary products like fish sauce or in curries. In Sri Lanka, this variety of fish is made into a tasty snack by dipping in a batter of flour, then rolled in bread crumbs and deep fried in oil. It is also popular as a ‘white curry’, i.e.a curry made with coconut milk. A spicier variant is made with dry chilli gravy and served with scraped fresh coconut to offset the hotness of the gravy.

Vernacular names
Commerson's anchovy is known as:
Dilis in Filipino
Haalmassa (හාල්මැස්සා) in Sinhala
Netthallu (నెత్తళ్ళు) in Telugu

See also
List of fish in India
List of marine bony fishes of South Africa
List of common commercial fish of Sri Lanka

References

commersonnii
Fish of the Indian Ocean
Fish of the Pacific Ocean
Fish of Thailand
Fish described in 1803
Taxa named by Bernard Germain de Lacépède